Pudhiya Geethai ( New Gita) is a 2003 Indian Tamil-language drama film written and directed by newcomer K. P. Jagan. The film stars Vijay in the main lead role with Meera Jasmine and Ameesha Patel in the female lead roles. Kalabhavan Mani and Karunas play other supporting roles. Notably, this film is Patel's first and remains her only Tamil film till date. The film, which has music scored by brothers Yuvan Shankar Raja and Karthik Raja.

Pudhiya Geethai was released on 8 May 2003. The movie was dubbed in Hindi as Ek Dumdaar The Powerful.  The film received negative reviews and became a box-office failure.

Plot
The movie starts with a polydactylic baby boy born to Chinnaya from Nagapattinam, who works for Swamy, an astrologer. Swamy writes the horoscope of the baby and understands that the child will grow up to be an intelligent and responsible person but, he also predicts that the child's life will be only 27 years short. He suggests the baby to be named Sarathy but does not inform about the short life.
 
Back to the present in Chennai, Sarathy is an intelligent person and an optimist, who excels in studies and sports and is also liked by everyone around him. He takes care of his mother Thaiyalnayagi and sister, following his father's death. Suji is Sarathy's close friend and considers him as her well-wisher. Sarathy runs a restaurant with his friends as part-time and is also involved in real estate transactions earning brokerages. Jo is Suji's friend who teases her by being closer to Sarathy, revealing the love that she had for him. 
 
Reddiyar is a rich but ingenuous businessman. He is into real estate business and cheats many people by allotting improper plots. Sarathy knows about Reddiyar's plans and fight against him supporting the poor people, which creates enmity between Reddiyar and Sarathy.
 
Lawrence is Sarathy's friend. He falls in love with Sarathy's sister but is scared whether Sarathy will accept their love. Sarathy happily accepts and also convinces his mother. Sarathy's sister's wedding is arranged. Now, Sarathy is 27 years old. Meanwhile, Suji feels jealous about Sarathy and Jo getting close to each other, but Jo realizes that Suji is in love with Sarathy. Finally, Suji proposes her love to Sarathy, which he accepts.
 
On the day of Sarathy's sister's marriage, Jo explains the love that Suji has for Sarathy and vice versa. Sarathy goes to meet Suji, but Reddiyar has planned to kill Sarathy on the way. Sarathy fights Reddiyar's men, and Reddiyar is left alone. However, Sarathy does not kill Reddiyar and instead makes him understand the value for life and the talks about the positive attitude that one should have. This makes Reddiyar realize his mistake.
 
Sarathy leaves the place to meet Suji but meets with an accident on the way and gets admitted to the hospital with severe injuries. The doctors say that the chances of his survival are minimal, and all his family and friends cry outside the hospital, but Reddiyar, who was Sarathy's former enemy, comes to the place and witnesses everyone crying and panicking. He tells everyone to stop crying and keeps calling Sarathy with a positive energy, which will make him get back to normal. Everyone starts calling Sarathy and his condition improves drastically. Sarathy is saved and recovers. Sarathy then lives 100 years of his wish which leads his life happily.

The movie ends with a message that positive attitude is essential for everyone to succeed, even death will revive them.

Cast

Production
In August 2002, Vijay signed on to work on the film, which was initially titled Sarathy after the lead character. The project was then titled as Geethai with Esha Deol as heroine. However the film eventually featured two lead actresses with Meera Jasmine being signed on to be a part of the project after the success of her 2002 film, Run. Amisha Patel also accepted to be a part of the film, replacing Deol, after getting the entire script translated in English for her to read. Before release, the film's title was changed to Pudhiya Geethai.

Soundtrack

The songs were composed by Yuvan Shankar Raja, while his elder brother Karthik Raja composed the film's background score. The audio CD containing songs released on 29 March 2003 and features 6 tracks, the lyrics were penned by Vaali, Pa. Vijay, Yugabharathi and Vijay Sagar. The film remains Vijay's only collaboration with Yuvan Shankar Raja.

Release
Pudhiya Geethai released on 8 May 2003.

Reception
The film earned mostly negative reviews. The critic from The Hindu stated that "the end is predictable, but the conviction with which the climax drives home the message makes it interesting." Another reviewer stated the film had "nothing new", describing it as "real melodramatic soap-opera that moves hearts of viewers and at the same time gives a message for the audience." Ananda Vikatan rated the film 39 out of 100.

The film did not perform well at the box office.

References

External links
 

2003 films
2000s Tamil-language films
Indian action drama films
Films scored by Yuvan Shankar Raja
2003 directorial debut films
2000s action drama films